Petar Mijović (born 23 February 1982) is a Montenegrin professional basketball coach who is the U-19 head coach and youth system coordinator for Studentski centar of the Prva A Liga.

Coaching career

Budućnost (2017–2021)
In 2017 Mijović joined the coaching staff of Budućnost under-19 as head coach. In the next season, he was added to the senior team's coaching staff.

On 24 April 2019, following the resignation of Jasmin Repeša, Mijović was named new head coach of Budućnost. On 20 June 2019, his position took Slobodan Subotić. On 19 October 2019, Subotić resigned and Mijović was appointed head coach of Budućnost for the second time in his head coaching career. In June 2020, he extended his contract with Budućnost for the 2020–21 season. On 27 January 2021, Mijović resigned as the head coach.

Śląsk Wrocław (2021)
On June 2, 2021, he has signed a 3-year contract with Śląsk Wrocław of the Polish Basketball League.

Career accomplishments and awards
As head coach:
 Montenegrin League champion: 1 (with Budućnost: 2018–19)

References

External links 
 Petar Mijovic
 Profile at eurobasket.com
 Profile at euroleague.net

1982 births
Living people
KK Budućnost coaches
KK Podgorica coaches
Montenegrin basketball coaches
Montenegrin expatriate basketball people in France
Montenegrin expatriate basketball people in Kosovo
People from Bar, Montenegro